Annabessacook Lake is a lake located in the towns of Monmouth and Winthrop, Maine. It is one of the major bodies of water in the Winthrop Lakes Region.

References

Lakes of Kennebec County, Maine
Winthrop, Maine
Lakes of Maine